The 32nd British Academy Film Awards, given by the British Academy of Film and Television Arts at the Wembley Conference Centre, London in 1979, honoured the best films of 1978.

The film Julia had ten nominations and four awards, including Best Film of 32nd BAFTA.

Winners and nominees

Statistics

See also
 51st Academy Awards
 4th César Awards
 31st Directors Guild of America Awards
 36th Golden Globe Awards
 5th Saturn Awards
 31st Writers Guild of America Awards

References

Film032
British Academy Film Awards
British Academy Film Awards
British Academy Film Awards
British Academy Film Awards
1978 awards in the United Kingdom